Siamak Kouroshi (born 27 December 1989) is an Iranian footballer who plays as a defender.

Club career
Kouroshi joined Naft Tehran in 2010, after spending the previous season with Sanati Kaveh in the Azadegan League.

On 22 November 2021, Kouroshi joined Bangladesh Premier League club Swadhinata KS

Club career statistics

International career

He made his debut against Mauritania on 18 April 2012 under Carlos Queiroz.

References

External links
 Kouroshi on Instagram
 Kouroshi on Facebook

1989 births
Living people
Sportspeople from Isfahan
Iranian footballers
Sanati Kaveh players
Naft Tehran F.C. players
Malavan players
Saipa F.C. players
Muaither SC players
Foolad FC players
Iranian expatriate footballers
Iranian expatriate sportspeople in Qatar
Expatriate footballers in Qatar
Azadegan League players
Persian Gulf Pro League players
Qatari Second Division players
Association football central defenders